Villenbach is a municipality  in the district of Dillingen in Bavaria in Germany. The town is a member of the municipal association Wertingen.

References

Dillingen (district)